William Gilbert Grace Jr (6 July 1874 – 2 March 1905) was an English first-class cricketer who was the first-born son of W. G. Grace. 

He won scholarships to Clifton College and Pembroke College, Cambridge, where he studied mathematics. He played in 57 matches for Cambridge University, Gloucestershire and London County in a career lasting from 1893 to 1903, playing as an all-rounder. He made 1,324 runs at an average of 15.21 with a highest score of 79, and took 42 wickets at an average of 39.45 with a best of six for 79.

Grace often played for Gloucestershire, London County and MCC alongside his father, his brother Charles Grace and his uncle E. M. Grace, mostly under his father's captaincy. Grace also played rugby union for the Northants and East Midland XV. 

He became a schoolteacher, teaching at Oundle School in Northamptonshire and then at Royal Naval College, Osborne. He died in 1905 at the age of 30 after an operation for appendicitis.

References

1874 births
1905 deaths
Alumni of Pembroke College, Cambridge
Cambridge University cricketers
English cricketers
Gentlemen cricketers
Gloucestershire cricketers
London County cricketers
Marylebone Cricket Club cricketers
People educated at Clifton College
Sportspeople from Kensington
Teachers of Oundle School
W. G. Grace
Gentlemen of the South cricketers
Gentlemen of England cricketers
W.G. Jr
W. G. Grace's XI cricketers
Deaths from appendicitis